Vanderlei José Alves (born October 29, 1978 in Lauro Müller-SC), or simply Vanderlei, is a Brazilian football striker. He currently plays for Clube Atlético Tubarão.

Career 
He became the Campeonato Brasileiro Série B 2006's top scorer with 21 goals.

Honours

Individual
 Brazilian 2nd Division League Top Scorer: * 2006

Team
Santa Catarina State League: 1999
Minas Gerais State League: 2007

Contract
1 January 2001 to 31 December 2008

External links
 
 Vanderlei at CBF  
 Vanderlei at Zerozero.pt 
 Vanderlei at Guardian Stats Centre
 Vanderlei at Atletico.com.br 
 

1978 births
Living people
Brazilian footballers
Figueirense FC players
Vila Nova Futebol Clube players
Sociedade Esportiva do Gama players
Clube Atlético Mineiro players
Association football forwards